Isaac Van Horne (January 13, 1754, Solebury Township, Pennsylvania – February 2, 1834, Zanesville, Ohio) was a member of the U.S. House of Representatives from Pennsylvania.

Early life
He was the eldest son of Bernard Van Horne and his first wife Sarah Van Pelt. He is descended from several Dutch families that came to America when New York was a Colony of the Netherlands. His father's family, sometimes spelled "van Hoorn", had earlier been identified with the European Noble Family of that name.

His paternal immigrant ancestor Christian Barentsen van Hoorn had a house lot at Wall Street and Broadway which is now part of Trinity Churchyard, and was Fire Marshal of Manhattan in the 1650s before moving to the area of Wilmington, Delaware. His grandmother, Alice Sleght Van Horn, may have been descended from Catherine Trico Rapalgie, one of whose daughters was reputed to be the first white child born in New Netherland. He was also the 3x-great grand nephew of Peter Stuyvesant (c.1612—1672).

Career
He apprenticed as a carpenter and cabinetmaker and served was justice of the peace for Solebury Township in Bucks County of Pennsylvania for several years as well as coroner of Bucks County four years.

Military career
In 1775, he was elected ensign of a company of militia, and appointed ensign in the Continental Army by the committee of safety in January 1776, assigned to Capt. John Beatty's Company in Col. Magaw's Regiment.

He was taken prisoner at the fall of Fort Washington and held as a prisoner of war from November 1776 to May 1778 when he was exchanged.  He served as first lieutenant, captain lieutenant, and captain until the close of the American Revolutionary War.  Van Horn was also a founding member of the Society of the Cincinnati.

From 1808 until 1810, he was Lt. Col. Commanding 1st Reg. 2nd Brig. of the Ohio Militia. During the War of 1812, he served as Adjutant General of the Ohio Militia from 1810 until 1819.

Political career
From 1796 to 1797, he was a member of the Pennsylvania House of Representatives.  Immediately following his term in the Pennsylvania House, he was elected as a Republican or Jeffersonian, to the Seventh and Eighth United States Congresses.

In 1805, he moved to Zanesville, Ohio, after President Jefferson appointed him receiver of the land office at Zanesville. He held that office until December 1826 when he resigned in favor of his son Bernard.  After he moved to Zanesville his first residence was a white Clapboard house on Pine St., built for him by his nephew, which was locally known as "the White House."

He was involved in a number of early Zanesville businesses, was a large landholder and served as President of The Second Federal Bank of Zanesville.  He also served as head of a political faction in the 2d Capital of Ohio.

Personal life
He married Dorothy Marple, the widow of Isaac Marple with whom she had already had two sons: John J. Marple and David J. Marple. Dorothy had 11 more children with Isaac:
Dorothy Jane Van Horne, who married Peter van Woglom and later Isaac van Horne (a cousin)
Sarah Van Horne
Mary "Polly" Van Horne, who married Jeffrey Price, a widower with a daughter
CPT Isaac Van Horne Jr., 2d Battle of Fort Mackinac during the War of 1812
Samuel Van Horne
Eliza Nann Van Horne, who married Dr. John E. Hamm (1776–1864), Marshall of Ohio during War of 1812, who with Isaac Van Horne, founded the White Glass Co. of Zanesville, Ohio in 1815, of which Isaac Van Horne was President.
Patience Van Horne, who married Harry Safford (a silversmith in Putnam, OH)
Cynthia Van Horne
Bernard Van Horne, who was his successor as receiver of public monies at Zanesville in 1826
Benjamin Franklin Van Horne
Bvt. Maj. Joseph Jefferson Van Horne, who fought in the U.S.-Mexican War.
Van Horne died February 2, 1834, in Zanesville, Ohio.  One of the bequests in his will was a donation to the American Colonization Society.

References

The Political Graveyard
 Our Van Horne and Culbertson Forebears. William R. Van Horne, Lancaster, PA, 1983.
 Y Bridge City "The Story of Zanesville and Muskingum County, Ohio". Norris F. Schneider, The World Publishing Co., 1950.
"a Brief Memoir of the Life of General Isaac Van Horne". Zanesville Ohio, (undated) privately reprinted several times.

1754 births
1834 deaths
People from Bucks County, Pennsylvania
People of colonial Pennsylvania
American people of Dutch descent
Democratic-Republican Party members of the United States House of Representatives from Pennsylvania
Members of the Pennsylvania House of Representatives
Politicians from Zanesville, Ohio
Continental Army officers from Pennsylvania
American Revolutionary War prisoners of war held by Great Britain